The 2018–19 Egyptian Super Cup (also known as the 2018–19 SAIB Egyptian Super Cup for sponsorship reasons) was the 16th Egyptian Super Cup, an annual football match played between the winners of the previous season's Egyptian Premier League and Egypt Cup. It was played at Borg El Arab Stadium in Alexandria, Egypt, on 20 September 2019, contested by Al Ahly and Zamalek. Al Ahly defended the trophy they won in the previous edition and defeated Zamalek 3–2, winning their record-extending 11th trophy.

Background

In the 2017–18 Egyptian Premier League, Al Ahly and Ismaily were the only two teams in the league's title race, with the latter finishing the first half of the season on top. However, after Frenchman coach Sébastien Desabre left Ismaily mid-season to join the Ugandan national team as their manager, the club started to fall apart and went from being on top with a difference of 4 points to finishing the league behind Al Ahly with 68 points; 20 points less than the champions. Al Ahly officially won their record-extending fortieth Egyptian Premier League title on 12 March 2018 with 6 games to spare. The team broke numerous league records over the course of the season, including most points with 88 points, most wins with 28 wins and most goals scored in a single season with 75 goals. Al Ahly's Moroccan forward Walid Azaro also finished the league as the top goalscorer with 18 goals.

Zamalek won the 2017–18 Egypt Cup after defeating Smouha 5–4 on penalties in the final after the match ended 1–1 at extra time, winning their 4th Egypt Cup title in the previous 5 editions of the competition. Both teams' way to the final was considered "too easy" by the media, especially for Zamalek who faced 2017–18 Egyptian Second Division sides El Minya and Haras El Hodoud in the round of 32 and round of 16 respectively. The Egyptian Football Association were also heavily criticized for changes they made to the competition, mainly for the changes made to the draw where they made sure that the cup defending champions can only face the previous league winners in the final.

During the 2017–18 season, both teams met each other in the league two times. Al Ahly won the first encounter 3–0 on 8 January 2018 at Cairo International Stadium thanks to goals from Moamen Zakaria, Abdallah El Said and Walid Azaro. Zamalek won the second encounter 2-1 which was played on 26 April 2018 at the same stadium, with Kabongo Kasongo and Ayman Hefny scoring for Zamalek and Walid Soliman scoring the only goal for Al Ahly.

Match

Officials
On 19 September 2019, just one day before the match, the Egyptian Football Association announced German referee Felix Brych as the referee for the match. Brych is ranked as a UEFA elite category referee, and he is considered one of the best referees in Europe. His compatriots Mark Borsch and Kim Stefan Luppwere chosen as the assistant referees, while Egyptian referee Mohamed Hassan was chosen as the fourth official.

Details

References

Egyptian Super Cup
2018–19 in Egyptian football
Egyptian Super Cup 2018
Egyptian Super Cup 2018